Shaan Shahid is a Pakistani film actor, director and writer. He made his debut with a 1990 film Bulandi. His works include the 2007 film Khuda Ke Liye and 2013 film Waar which broke previous box office records in Pakistan. The following is a list of the films he has participated in as an actor or director.

As an actor

As a director

References

External links 
 

Director filmographies
Male actor filmographies
Pakistani filmographies